Cortanze is a comune (municipality) in the Province of Asti in the Italian region Piedmont, located about  east of Turin and about  northwest of Asti.

The municipality of Cortanze contains the frazioni (subdivisions, mainly villages and hamlets) Roera and San Rocco.

Cortanze borders the following municipalities: Cunico, Montechiaro d’Asti, Piea, Soglio, and Viale.

References

Cities and towns in Piedmont